St. Mary's Episcopal Church is a parish of the Episcopal Church (United States), noted for its historic church at 14–16 Cushing Avenue in the Dorchester neighborhood of Boston, Massachusetts. Founded in 1847, it remains an active congregation of the Episcopal Diocese of Massachusetts.

The first church building, on Bowdoin Street, burned down in 1887, prompting the formation of St. Mark's Church and the building of the current structure. Designed by the English architect Henry Vaughan, the Tudor Revival church building was built in 1888. In 1893 it was expanded in a matching style with the addition of transepts and the chancel by architects Hartwell & Richardson. The parish house was designed by Charles K. Cummings and built in 1907. The church contains a high-quality collection of stained glass windows, including the work of Tiffany Studios and Charles Jay Connick.

The property was listed on the National Register of Historic Places in 1998. Services are held on Sundays at 9am, 11am and 1pm (in Spanish, not on first Sundays). One of the oldest food pantries in the area is located in the church.

See also
National Register of Historic Places listings in southern Boston, Massachusetts

References

External links
Official Church Website

Churches on the National Register of Historic Places in Massachusetts
Religious organizations established in 1847
Churches completed in 1888
19th-century Episcopal church buildings
Episcopal churches in Boston
Stone churches in Massachusetts
Dorchester, Boston
National Register of Historic Places in Boston